Xianghu may refer to:

 Wu Xianghu, a Chinese journalist
 Xianghu Station, Hangzhou Metro, China
 Xianghu, a subdistrict of Furong District, Changsha, China.